Ash Ridge is an unincorporated community in Brown County, in the U.S. state of Ohio.

History
Ash Ridge was originally called Carlisle, and under the latter name was platted in 1834. A post office called Ash Ridge was established in 1846, and remained in operation until 1906.

References

Unincorporated communities in Brown County, Ohio
1834 establishments in Ohio
Populated places established in 1834
Unincorporated communities in Ohio